Margencel is a commune in the Haute-Savoie department in the Auvergne-Rhône-Alpes region in south-eastern France.

Landmark 

 St. Lawrence Church

See also
Communes of the Haute-Savoie department

References

Communes of Haute-Savoie